The Narrow Garden is a live album by violinist/multi-instrumentalist Eyvind Kang which was released in 2012 on  Ipecac Recordings.

Reception

The album received generally favorable reviews with Metacritic giving it a score of 73% from 6 reviews.

The PopMatters review by Brice Ezell stated "it’s curious how much of The Narrow Garden doesn’t sound cutting-edge. Much of it sounds quite familiar, actually. ...The Narrow Garden is perhaps best described as a “floating album.” Taken by itself, it has some pretty tracks, as well as some intriguing ones. Yet for the majority of the album I was left wondering what this music was meant to be used for. This means that even if you are taken by the prettiness of the music while you’re listening to it, by the album’s end you’ll be wondering where the music is supposed to go".

The Allmusic review by Thom Jurek was more enthusiastic observing "The Narrow Garden succeeds, far more than either The Yelm Sessions or Athlantis, because there is nothing "narrow" about it. Its more accessible root melodies leave room for a wider array of colors and textures to naturally find their way into its mix. It is his most ambitious and focused work, and combines not only instruments and musical traditions, but cultural sonances and histories as well".

Pitchfork reviewer Brian Howe noted "you don't have to strain too hard to hear Kang's intricate weaving of soft, romantic consonances and harsh, anxious dissonances as an expression of the quicksilver joys and miseries of formalized desire. Taking in lyric poetry, Western choral music, Middle Eastern and South Asian modes, and "ashugh" singing (a popular folk tradition heavily associated with the Caucasus), The Narrow Garden features some of the most sunny and flowering music that Kang has created, seamlessly joined with a couple of sinister threnodies."

Track listing 
All compositions by Eyvind Kang with lyrics by Guilhem IX (track 2) and Sulpicia (tracks 6 & 7)
 "Forest Sama'l" - 5:28
 "Pure Nothing" - 4:59
 "Usnea" - 7:23
 "Mineralia" - 4:29
 "The Narrow Garden" - 5:25
 "Nobis Natalis" - 1:14
 "Invisus Natalis" - 9:31

Personnel 
Eyvind Kang - composer, director
Daphna Mor - flute
Bassam Saba - flute, ney
Josiah Boothby - French horn
Taina Karr - oboe
Michael Ibrahim - bassoon
David Murgadas - guitar
Shelly Burgon - harp
Trevor Dunn - bass
April Centrone, Ferran Armengol - percussion
Jenny Scheinman, Roberto Riggio, Aleix Puig, Ariadna Padró, Gabriel Coll, Guillem Calvo, Oriol Sanã, Daniel Cuberco, Emilia Grajales, Gerard Purti, Lluna Aragón, Maria Sanz - violin
Laia Besalduch, Marc Terrida, Miquel Córdoba, Stephanie Griffin - viola
Amat Santacana, Eva Gumà, Marika Hughes, Oleguer Aymami - cello
Christopher Williams, Felipe Contreras - contrabass
Jessika Kenney - vocals

References 

2012 albums
Ipecac Recordings albums
Eyvind Kang albums